Henleyville is an unincorporated community in Tehama County, in the U.S. state of California.

History
A post office was in operation at Henleyville from 1873 until 1936. The community has the name of William N. Henley, a local cattleman.

References

Unincorporated communities in Tehama County, California